Fichter is a surname of German origin. Notable people with the surname include:

Friedrich Fichter (1869–1952), Swiss professor of chemistry 
Hermann Fichter (1845–1912), American soldier during the Apache Wars
Jennifer Fichter (born 1984), high school teacher convicted of sexual battery
John Fichter (1935–2014), Republican member of the Pennsylvania House of Representatives
Mike Fichter (born 1974), former Major League Baseball umpire
Robert W. Fichter (born 1939), American photographer
Stephen Fichter (born 1967), American priest, sociologist, author, app creator, film producer, and pastor.

See also

References